Greatest Hits Radio is a classic hits radio network in the United Kingdom, owned and operated by Bauer.

Overview
The network launched on 5 January 2015 as the "Bauer City 2 Network", and rebranded on 7 January 2019 due to the success of Radio City 2 in Liverpool on FM.

As of December 2021, the network consists of 18 local and regional radio stations operating 50 FM and DAB licences in England, Scotland and Wales, as well as a national DAB station in areas not served by a local Bauer-owned licence.

In most cases, the stations are networked, apart from a three-hour regional afternoon show on weekdays and localised opt-outs for news, weather, travel and advertising. From 3rd April 2023 GHR will be the new home of the UK’s most popular Radio quiz Popmaster presented by Ken Bruce on his new show at 10:30 am on weekdays

History

Gold
The stations forming the Greatest Hits Radio network are predominantly sister stations to the corresponding Hits Radio network stations. Many were originally set up as a 'Gold' counterpart (e.g. Radio City Gold in Liverpool) when stations were instructed by the Independent Broadcasting Authority to cease simulcasting their services on both FM and AM in the late 1980s. The main exception to this was FM station West Sound in Dumfries and Galloway.

Greatest Hits Radio (Scotland) and Magic (Northern England)
In Northern England, the stations were rebranded as Magic in 1997 – a station brand first used by Radio Aire upon the launch of their AM station in July 1990.

In Scotland, local programming on AM stations was largely retained until networking outside of weekday breakfast and specialist shows was introduced in June 2009.

The Magic stations gradually began to form a network merging most of their schedule until, and by March 2013, only local content consisted of three regional breakfast shows on weekdays, serving the North West, the North East and Yorkshire.

In July 2013, the remaining Scottish local output ceased, leading to a fully networked schedule known as 'Greatest Hits Network.

Greatest Hits Radio (Scotland) and Radio City 2 (Northern England)
In September 2014, Bauer Radio announced it would rebrand the Magic stations under localised identities, based on the main FM station names (e.g. Magic 1152 in Manchester becomes Key 2, based on Key 103). Magic's AM network closed with the London equivalent, Magic 105.4 FM, launched nationwide on DAB.

The relaunch took place on Monday 5 January 2015. Initially, the two networks serving Scotland (The Greatest Hits Network) and northern England (City 2 Network) were replaced by one carrying programming from both nations over all stations, with some peak time opt-outs. Further split programming for the two nations was reintroduced the following year.

On 7 December 2015, Radio City 2 in Liverpool swapped frequencies with sister station Radio City Talk on 105.9 FM and reintroduced local programming at peak times.

In April 2018, Northsound 2 ceased analogue broadcasting on 1035 AM, becoming the first commercial radio station in Scotland – and the first local Bauer-owned station – to broadcast only on digital platforms (DAB and online).

On 4 June 2018, Key 2 in Manchester was rebranded as Key Radio, in tandem with Key 103's relaunch as Hits Radio.

Greatest Hits Radio (National)
On 7 January 2019, Greatest Hits Radio replaced the Bauer City 2 branding due to the success of Radio City 2 in Liverpool. Local station identities in Northern England took on Greatest Hits Radio branded names and Scottish stations retaining their local brands.

Greatest Hits Radio also became available on FM in the West Midlands taking over the 105.2 FM frequency from Absolute Radio. Greatest Hits Radio also took over Absolute Radio's London FM frequency (105.8) on 17 May 2021.

The network expanded with Greatest Hits Radio UK broadcasting across most of the local DAB multiplexes across the UK.

The service took the Liverpool FM programming with national news bulletins and traffic reports.

Network expansion
In May 2020, Bauer announced 48 local radio stations in England and South West Wales will rebrand and join the Greatest Hits Radio network, following the acquisition of licences from UKRD, Wireless Group, Lincs FM Group and Celador.

Most of the stations were merged and began carrying networked output, alongside a regional show on weekdays and localised news, travel and advertising.

On 13 July 2020, the former Wireless Group and Celador-owned stations joined the Greatest Hits Radio network. The nineteen stations carried local breakfast shows and voicetracked programming whilst retaining separate branding until the full relaunch on 1 September 2020.

On 1 September, Bauer closed down Leeds-based Radio Aire so that it could switch the frequency from the Hits Radio network to Greatest Hits Radio as part of the merging with twelve stations in Yorkshire and Lincolnshire.

On 17 September 2020, Bauer bought Radio Plymouth.

On 15 October 2020, it was announced that the Suffolk station Ipswich 102, part-owned by Bauer through their purchase of Lincs FM Group, would take the GHR brand and network programming, including the East region drivetime show, from November, with the former Town 102 on DAB, which had carried GHR East since the September network relaunch, being replaced by Hits Radio.

On 22 October 2020, it was reported the Oldham and Rochdale station Revolution 96.2 had been sold to Bauer for conversion into GHR, joining the Manchester AM and Bolton/Bury FM licenses in the GHR North West network.

In March 2021, Ofcom approved Bauer's application for permission to alter the FM licence held by the London FM relay of Absolute Radio, enabling the frequency to be used to provide a London variant of GHR. with Absolute Radio continuing to be available by way of its national AM and digital transmissions. The change took place on 17 May.

On 17 June 2021 Bauer announced the purchase of Imagine Radio from the Like Media Group, with the existing Imagine service slated to be replaced by separate GHR feeds for Stockport and North Cheshire and the Peak District and Derbyshire Dales.

On 19 September 2022, Wave 105's Poole transmitter began carrying Greatest Hits Radio Dorset.

On 22 November 2022, Bauer announced that CFM in Cumbria & South West Scotland will rebrand to Greatest Hits Radio from 3 April 2023.

On 31 January 2023, Bauer announced that Radio Borders is to rebrand as Greatest Hits Radio from 3 April, following the news earlier in the month which will see the seven Scottish heritage names also rebranding on the same day.

On 1 March 2023, Bauer announced that Lincs FM will lose its FM frequency and go DAB only from 3 April. The FM frequency will become Greatest Hits Radio.

On the same day, Bauer also announced that three of the four FM frequencies held by Kiss in Cambridge (105.6), Ipswich and Colchester (106.4) and Peterborough (107.7), will switch to carrying Greatest Hits Radio and join the GHR East network. The 106.1 frequency in Norwich will continue to carry Kiss.

Stations

United Kingdom
GHR UK

East & West Midlands
GHR Midlands
Birmingham & the West Midlands
Black Country & Shropshire
Coventry & Warwickshire
Derbyshire, Leicestershire & Nottinghamshire
Herefordshire & Worcestershire
Staffordshire & Cheshire (unchanged)
Stamford and Rutland

East of England
GHR East
Essex
Norfolk & North Suffolk
Ipswich and Suffolk - DAB only
West Norfolk
Cambridgeshire - from 3rd April

Former stations
Suffolk (DAB) – carries Hits Radio as of 3 Nov 2020

London
GHR London

North East England
GHR North East
North East
Teesside

North West England
GHR North West
Cumbria - DAB only (FM from April 2023 replacing CFM)
Greater Manchester 
Lancashire
Liverpool & The North West 
Wigan & St Helens
Oldham & Rochdale

Scotland
Aberdeen and Aberdeenshire - Broadcasting as Northsound 2, to rebrand as Greatest Hits Radio from April 2023
Ayrshire - Broadcasting as Westsound, to rebrand as Greatest Hits Radio from April 2023
Dumfries and Galloway - Broadcasting as Westsound, to rebrand as Greatest Hits Radio from April 2023
Edinburgh, Lothians and Fife - Broadcasting as Forth 2, to rebrand as Greatest Hits Radio from April 2023
Glasgow and West of Scotland - Broadcasting as Clyde 2, to rebrand as Greatest Hits Radio from April 2023
Scottish Highlands, Moray and Orkney -Broadcasting as MFR 2, to rebrand as Greatest Hits Radio from April 2023
Tayside - Broadcasting as Tay 2, to rebrand as Greatest Hits Radio from April 2023
Scottish Borders and North Northumberland - Currently broadcasting as Radio Borders, will rebrand as Greatest Hits Radio from 3rd April.

South East England
GHR South
Berkshire & North Hampshire 
Bucks, Beds and Herts 
Dorset 
Salisbury
South Coast - DAB only
Surrey & East Hampshire 
West Sussex

South West England
GHR South West
Bath & The South West
Bristol & The South West
 Cornwall - DAB only
Devon
Gloucestershire
Plymouth
Somerset
Swindon

Wales
GHR South Wales - DAB Only

Yorkshire and the Humber
GHR Yorkshire
East Yorkshire & Northern Lincolnshire - DAB only
Grimsby
Harrogate and the Yorkshire Dales
Lincolnshire - DAB only (FM from 3 April 2023)
North Derbyshire
South Yorkshire 
West Yorkshire 
York and North Yorkshire 
Yorkshire Coast

Programming 
Networked programming for GHR is produced and broadcast from the studios of several Bauer stations across the UK.
 In England, daytime output originates from Birmingham, Liverpool and Manchester and from Bauer's Golden Square headquarters in Soho.
 In Scotland, programming originates from the studios of Clyde 2 in Glasgow and Forth 2 in Edinburgh.
 In South West Wales, local programming originates from Bauer's Gowerton studios.

Off-peak time programming airs across all GHR stations from the Birmingham, Edinburgh, Manchester and Soho studios.

There are some opt-outs and variations:
In South West Wales, most of GHR's schedule consists of local programming – including daily breakfast shows, daytime output on weekdays and a Welsh language late show on Sunday – Thursday nights.
In the East, Midlands, North West, South, South West and Yorkshire, regional afternoon shows air each weekday from 1-4pm. These previously aired in the 4-7pm Drivetime slot until the launch of Simon Mayo's networked show on 15 March 2021.
The Scottish stations air a separate Drivetime show on weekdays from 3-7pm.

News 
Bauer's newsrooms across the UK air local and national news bulletins hourly from 6am to 7pm on weekdays and from 7am to 1pm on Saturdays and Sundays.

Headlines are broadcast on the half-hour during weekday breakfast and drivetime shows, alongside traffic bulletins.

At weekends, bespoke networked news bulletins air during the afternoon produced by the Bauer newsroom in Glasgow for Scotland and usually either Leeds or Manchester for England and Wales. At all other times, mainly evening and overnight, hourly national bulletins originate from Sky News Radio.

Notable presenters 

 Jackie Brambles
 Andy Crane
 Paul Gambaccini
 Mark Goodier
 Martin Kemp
 Alex Lester
 Simon Mayo
 Jenny Powell
 Simon 'Rossie' Ross
 Jo Russell
 Kate Thornton
 Richard Allinson
 Ken Bruce (From April 3rd 2023)
 Matt Williams (drivetime sport reporter)

Past presenters 
 Janice Long (died in 2021)
 Darren Proctor
 Rick Houghton
 Pat Sharp

Audience
According to RAJAR data, the GHR stations have a combined weekly reach of 4.4 million people as of December 2022.

References

External links
Greatest Hits Radio
Bauer Media

 
Bauer Radio
British radio networks